Roy Francis Lyons (28 March 1916 – 31 March 1996) was an Australian rules footballer who played with North Melbourne in the Victorian Football League (VFL).

Notes

External links 

1916 births
Australian rules footballers from Melbourne
North Melbourne Football Club players
1996 deaths
People from West Melbourne, Victoria